Heritage science is the interdisciplinary domain of scientific study of cultural or natural heritage. Heritage science draws on diverse humanities, sciences and engineering disciplines. It focuses on enhancing the understanding, care and sustainable use of heritage so it can enrich people's lives, both today and in the future. Heritage science is an umbrella term encompassing all forms of scientific enquiry into human works and the combined works of nature and humans, of value to people 

The term has become widely used after 2006, when it became increasingly evident that the more traditional terms conservation science or preservation science inadequately reflected the breadth of research into cultural heritage. Heritage scientists in museums, galleries, libraries, archives, universities and research institutions support conservation (often called conservation science), access (e.g. development of new ICT tools), interpretation, including archaeometry and archaeological science (e.g. dating, provenancing, attribution), heritage management (e.g. development of tools and knowledge supporting strategic or environmental management decisions) and wider societal engagement with heritage (e.g. heritage values and ethics). Heritage science is also an excellent vehicle for public engagement with science as well as heritage.

Heritage science is seen as "key to the long-term sustainability of heritage: it is about managing change and risk and maximising social, cultural and economic benefit not just today, but in such a way that we can pass on to future generations that which we have inherited." Domains of research, where heritage science makes a particular input were recognised by the United Kingdom National Heritage Science Strategy documents to be museums, galleries, libraries and archives; the built historic environment and archaeology.

Theory

The field still requires its literature canon, and opinions on whether heritage science is a domain in its own right or a field of research diverge. However, this appears to be a matter of academic recognition, rather than a matter of research practice.

Heritage science is an old field of research: in his Royal Institution Christmas Lecture in 1843, Michael Faraday already pointed out how pollution importantly contributes to book degradation. The following premises appear to be of defining importance:
 Heritage science is inherently biased, as scientists, by doing research on heritage, contribute to its value: they create and popularize heritage through their research. 
 Heritage science is neither fundamental nor experimental: work with actual heritage objects, buildings or sites cannot be repeatable, because heritage is not an experiment. On the other hand, the scientific method and deductive reasoning is easily applied when working with models and model objects, which heritage scientists often do due to the high value of actual historic objects and consequentially, sampling restrictions.

Since the historical context of heritage is often unknown, there can be any number of variables affecting the heritage system under observation – inductive reasoning is therefore often applied in heritage science. In this aspect, the premise of heritage science comes close to social science. Heritage that is accessible, in its preserved authentic form or as a (digital) reproduction, is also a "resource for economic growth, employment and social cohesion". Through improved access, heritage science can contribute to people's well-being. Heritage science is proof that there is no world of 'Two Cultures'. A scientist, researching heritage defies the existence of the divide: there can be no scientific research of heritage without a contribution by humanities research. Heritage science also successfully bridges science and notions of culture, because it provides an attractive vehicle to convey ideas and concepts related to technology and engineering, as well as culture and society. Heritage science can be considered an anthropogenic analogue to environmental geography, which was defined by Halford Mackinder in 1887 as a discipline that aims to "bridge one of the greatest of all gaps" between "the natural sciences and the study of humanity".  A different definition of heritage as part of a group's social psychology has been proposed by F.F.J. Schouten as "history processed through mythology, ideology, nationalism, local pride, romantic ideas or just plain marketing."

Research

Heritage science is an increasingly lively science domain. Materials and techniques of the past are often very difficult to study and state-of-the-art techniques and methods need to be employed. Discoveries new to science are often the result of such endeavours, e.g. new antibiotics from bacteria discovered in the Cave of Altamira, in Spain. With its wide definition, heritage science spans a significant variety of scientific activities. In order to support conservation, access, interpretation and management, heritage science must be based on an interdisciplinary palette of knowledge, from fundamental sciences (chemistry, physics, mathematics, biology) to arts and humanities (conservation, archaeology, philosophy, ethics, history, art history etc.), including economics, sociology, computer sciences and engineering.

In academia, heritage science is often performed by scientists spending a proportion of their time on heritage-related research. The academic field, judged by the number of academic outputs published annually, is steadily increasing. This could be taken to estimate the domain size – with the number of outputs in 2014 being 6,800 (Source: Web of Science), it could be assumed that there are about 3,000 heritage scientists active in the field (publishing on average 2 academic publications per year). This goes against the generally held view that the field is small.

The proportion per country varies greatly, about 20% of researchers being active in the US, 15% in the UK, 10% in Italy, 5% France, and 5% in China (with a strong increase in the last decade).

While the results of the field are published in a large number of journals from the application and methodology field that accept interdisciplinary publications, since 2013, a specific journal was developed for the field, Heritage Science. In 2013, the Mind the Gap project, funded by the UK EPSRC/AHRC Science and Heritage Programme, reported on the drivers and impediments in cross-disciplinary research. The project found that there is no gap between rigour and relevance in heritage science research, but rather that there is a continuum of activity. However, there was less satisfaction with heritage science research in relation to its impact on practice, in comparison to its academic impact.

In 2017, in the frame of H2020-INFRADEV-2016-2 [needs explanation], the European Commission funded the Preparatory Phase of the project European Research Infrastructure for Heritage Science (E-RIHS) that supports research on heritage interpretation, preservation, documentation and management. Its mission is to deliver integrated access to expertise, data and technologies through a standardized approach, and to integrate world-leading European facilities into an organisation with a clear identity and a strong cohesive role within the global heritage science community. E-RIHS is currently in a transition and implementation phase to change its status into a European Research Infrastructure Consortium (ERIC) in 2022.

At the University of Opole in Poland, the UNESCO Chair on Cultural Property Law publishes critical research relating to the intersection between law, culture, cultural diversity, and cultural heritage.

Higher education

The heritage science career paths are various. Due to the cross-disciplinary nature of heritage science, any academic background is suitable, from formal sciences, natural sciences to social sciences. Most researchers have entered the field by carrying out doctoral research in the field, because there is currently no undergraduate course in this domain. Since 2010, Master's degree courses in heritage science have become available at University College London and Queen's University Belfast. In Italy, students can obtain undergraduate and/or graduate degrees in conservation science at the University of Florence, University of Bologna, and a recently created programme at the University of Venice. Several other universities in Italy have faculty members whose primary research focus is in heritage science; these groups often accept international students who would like to obtain a PhD in the field. Taught courses in heritage science programmes include elements of heritage science, e.g. technical art history is often part of art history courses, and natural sciences are often taught in conservation courses. Brandenburg University of Technology in Germany offers the international Master's programme World Heritage Studies  and PhD programme Heritage Studies.

At University College London, University of Oxford and University of Brighton, the Centre for Doctoral Training in Science and Engineering in Arts, Heritage and Archaeology (SEAHA) was established in 2014. A key aspect of the SEAHA scheme is the collaborative nature of projects, enabling partnerships between academic institutions, industry and national heritage agencies and giving an applied focus to the research training.

Since the field requires significant cross-disciplinary and transferable skills, graduates may be able to take jobs in industry and academia. To work within the field of heritage science (e.g. in a museum laboratory), a PhD in a field of science and significant experience in a heritage environment is typically required.

Professional activities

Many major heritage institutions have heritage science departments:
 Museum Conservation Institute of the Smithsonian Institution, USA
 Department of Conservation and Science of the British Museum, UK
 Centre for Conservation Research, France
 Getty Conservation Institute, USA
Conservation Science Department of the V&A Museum, UK
 Science Laboratory of the Art Institute of Chicago, USA
 The Netherlands Institute for Conservation, Art and Science, The Netherlands
 Istituto Superiore per la Conservazione e il Restauro, Italy
 Opificio delle Pietre Dure, Italy
 Institute of Heritage Sciences of the National Research Council, Italy
 Koninklijk Instituut voor het Kunstpatrimonium/Institut Royal du Patrimoine Artistique, Belgium
 University of Oxford - Resilient Buildings and Landscapes Lab (OxRBL), UK
 Instituto del Patrimonio Cultural de España, Spain
 Paris-Saclay University's Graduate School of Humanities and Heritage Sciences, France

A UK body, the National Heritage Science Forum was established to enable the 'users' and 'doers' of heritage science to access information on heritage science research, to exchange knowledge and increase collaboration. In 2016, the forum had 20 institutional members.

Several international professional associations have heritage science groups:
 Committee for Conservation, Working Group Scientific Research (International Council of Museums)
 Institute for Conservation, Heritage Science Group (Institute for Conservation)
 Royal Society of Chemistry, Heritage Science Expert Working Group (EWG), which produces freely available Technical Briefs  on a wide range of topics for conservators, scientists, and students

The Heritage Science Research Network captures the current activity in the field in the UK. In Spain, the Spanish Network of Science and Technology for the Conservation of Cultural Heritage (TechnoHeritage) brings together more than 65 research groups working in heritage science, from the Spanish National Research Council (CSIC), universities, conservation institutes and other cultural institutions.

Events
The major heritage science events (conferences, symposia, meetings etc.) are:
 Science and Engineering in Arts, Heritage and Archaeology
 Gordon Research Conference Scientific Methods in Cultural Heritage Research
 Technart 
 Eastern Analytical Symposium, Conservation Science session
 International Symposium on Archaeometry
 Lasers in the Conservation of Artworks
 Indoor Air Quality in Museums, libraries and Archives
 CMA4CH Biennial Meeting
 Synchrotron Radiation and Neutrons in Art and Archaeology
In addition, conferences organised by the Institute of Conservation, American Institute for Conservation and International Institute for Conservation usually feature heritage science sessions and talks.

Journals
Journals often or exclusively publishing academic papers in heritage science:
 Heritage Science
 Heritage
 Analytical Chemistry
 Archaeometry
 Journal of Cultural Heritage
 Studies in Conservation
 International Journal of Architectural Heritage
 International Biodeterioration & Biodegradation
 Journal of the American Institute for Conservation
 Journal of Architectural Conservation
 e-Preservation Science
 GE-Conservacion
Santander Art and Culture Law Review

See also
Heritage studies
Paleo-inspiration

References

Collections care
Conservation and restoration of cultural heritage
Museology
Cultural heritage
Art history
Science and culture
Applied sciences